Saye is a village and seat of the commune of Sana in the Cercle of Macina in the Ségou Region of southern-central Mali.

References

Populated places in Ségou Region